Tadashi Nakamura may refer to:

, Japanese biathlete
 Tadashi Nakamura (filmmaker) (born c. 1980), Japanese-American filmmaker
, Japanese footballer and manager
, Japanese karateka
, Japanese voice actor